Jaime Erica Murray (born 21 July 1976) is an English actress. She is known for playing Stacie Monroe in the BBC series Hustle (2004–2012), Lila West in the Showtime series Dexter (2007), Gaia in the Starz miniseries Spartacus: Gods of the Arena (2011), Olivia Charles in The CW series Ringer (2011–2012), Helena G. Wells in the Syfy series Warehouse 13 (2010–2014), Stahma Tarr in the Syfy series Defiance (2013–2015), Fiona/the Black Fairy in the ABC series Once Upon a Time (2016–2017), Antoinette in The CW series The Originals (2018), and Nyssa al Ghul in Gotham.

Early life and education
Murray was born on 21 July 1976 in Hammersmith, London, England, to Elaine and Billy Murray. Just before taking her A Levels, Murray was diagnosed with dyslexia. She briefly studied philosophy and psychology at the London School of Economics, but dropped out to train at the Drama Centre London, where she graduated in 2000.

Acting
Murray's first role was miming the lyrics in the original video of Stretch & Vern's dance track "I'm Alive" (1996). Some of her early television appearances included minor guest roles in BBC One's Casualty, The Bill, Love Soup and ShakespeaRe-Told: The Taming of the Shrew.

Murray starred as Stacie Monroe in series 1–4 of Hustle. She reprised that role in Hustle, series 8.

Relocating to Los Angeles, Murray starred in Dexter as Lila West, Dexter Morgan's Narcotics Anonymous sponsor and the main antagonist in Season 2. In mid-2008, Murray joined the cast of The CW's series Valentine, playing the lead character, Grace Valentine. The show began airing in October 2008 but was cancelled by the end of the month. Murray was cast in another CW show, The Beautiful Life: TBL, as a wardrobe stylist, but the show was cancelled before she was able to appear.

Murray finished shooting Possessions in 2010 and soon thereafter began shooting The Rapture.
She starred in the horror film Devil's Playground (2010), directed by Mark McQueen, and then appeared as Helena G. Wells on the Syfy series Warehouse 13. Murray's portrayal of Wells received critical praise and was described as "saucy", "superb", as able to "anchor a series" and "endlessly fascinating". Her absence as the villainess in the season 3 Christmas episode, "The Greatest Gift", was bemoaned with the lamentation "she would have done it better". Murray was nominated for a 2012 Portal Award for her portrayal of Helena G. Wells on Warehouse 13.

Murray also made a guest appearances on the Fox series The Finder, where she played a drug co-ordinator. Murray starred in the Starz miniseries Spartacus: Gods of the Arena, as Gaia, a longtime friend of Lucretia. Murray also had a guest appearance in 2009 on CBS series NCIS, playing ICE Agent Julia Foster-Yates.

Murray made an appearance on the Partially Examined Life philosophy podcast, playing a part in Sartre's No Exit, alongside Lucy Lawless, Mark Linsenmayer and Wes Alwan.

From 2013, she portrayed the character of Stahma Tarr in the Syfy series Defiance, which aired its final episode in August 2015. Murray had a recurring role in the sixth season of Once Upon a Time as the Black Fairy.

She has recently been cast in The Originals final season as Antoinette, a vampire Elijah meets soon after losing his memories.

Murray also appeared in the fifth and final season of Gotham as Nyssa al Ghul.

Modelling
Murray modelled clothing in television advertisements for Debenhams department store. She is signed to Models 1 in London and has appeared in men's magazines such as GQ, Mayfair and FHM, as well as women's magazines like Hello!, Cosmopolitan and OK!.

Personal life
Murray married Bernie Cahill, a partner in an entertainment management company, in May 2014.

Filmography

References

External links

 
 
 
 

1976 births
Living people
20th-century English actresses
21st-century English actresses
Actors with dyslexia
Actresses from London
Alumni of the Drama Centre London
English expatriates in the United States
English female models
English film actresses
English television actresses
English video game actresses
English voice actresses
People from Hammersmith